Lake Josephine is a lake in Ramsey County, in the U.S. state of Minnesota.

Lake Josephine was named for Josephine McKenty, an early settler.

See also
List of lakes in Minnesota

References

Lakes of Minnesota
Lakes of Ramsey County, Minnesota